Bou Salem  (بوسالم) is a town and commune in the Jendouba Governorate, Tunisia. As of 2004 it had a population of 20,098. by 2014 this had grown 35,192.

History
In Roman times, Bou Salem was the site of an imperial domain, the Saltus Burunitanus, an important Latin inscription was found three kilometers from the town;  it shows the settlers of the imperial domain petition the emperor Commodus to complain about the corruption of the procurator of the field, farmers and violence of the soldiers.

The city was named Souk El Khemis ("Thursday market") until 1966, in relation to the weekly market held in what was an agricultural town.  Located in the Medjerda valley, its main economic activity remains  agriculture.

It is located on the territory of the Ouled Bou Salem tribe, which borders the territory of the Berber of Kroumirs. 
It was known as Souk El Khemis until 1966.

Infrastructure
The city of Bou-salem is connected within the Tunisian Highway System since 2016 with the extension of the A3 Highway from the neighboring Governorate of Béja.

See also
List of cities in Tunisia

References

Populated places in Jendouba Governorate
Communes of Tunisia
Tunisia geography articles needing translation from French Wikipedia